Type 1915 305 mm howitzer was a Russian heavy howitzer that saw service during World War I and II. Originally intended for Naval use, it was later purchased by the Army at a cost of 271,500 Rubles per piece, with the first order of 8 being sent on 13 August 1915.

See also
List of siege artillery

Weapons of comparable role, performance and era
BL 12 inch Howitzer British equivalent
Skoda 305 mm Model 1911 Austro-Hungarian equivalent

World War I artillery of Russia
World War I howitzers
305 mm artillery
Siege artillery
Weapons and ammunition introduced in 1915